Paasakiligal is a 2006 Indian Tamil-language drama film. It stars Prabhu, Murali, Navya Nair, Malavika, Manorama, Vadivelu, Nassar, Kalabhavan Mani, Roja, Vineeth  and others. The film was fully written by Dravida Munnetra Kazhagam (DMK) chief M. Karunanidhi, as it was a comeback film for the director-cum-politician.

Plot
Sethupathy (Prabhu) and his young brother Sevathayya (Murali) are fond of their only sister Maragadham (Navya Nair) living in Melur village.

Vairaghya Bhoopathy (Nassar) is the chief of the neighboring village Aalur and the two families are rival for generations. But Maragadham falls for Nallarasu (Vineeth), brother of Bhoopathy.

Then comes Alakalan (Kalabhavan Mani) a schemer who wants to marry Maragadham. Both the brothers humiliate him and send him back. He ends up marrying Bhoopathy's sister Angayarkanni (Roja) but manager to create an enmity between the two families.

Meanwhile, dancer (Malavika) falls in love with Sethupathy. Alakalan has an eye on her as well. A turn of events results in Bhoopathy's suicide.

Now, Nallarasu takes revenge on Sethupathy who was responsible for his brother's death. So he marries Maragadham only to torture her.

The rest of the film is all about how Sethupathy and Sevathayya reveals the true color of Alakalan and as predicted all comes to a happy ending.

Cast 
 Prabhu as Sethupathy
 Murali as Sevathayya
 Navya Nair as Maragadham
 Vineeth as Nallarasu
 Nassar as Vairaghya Bhoopathy
 Kalabhavan Mani as Alakalan
 Roja as Angayarkanni
 Vadivelu as Thandavan
 Malavika
 Manorama
 Singamuthu
 Halwa Vasu

Soundtrack

Vidyasagar composed the music for the film.

"Aruviyoda" - K. S. Chithra
"Thendral Ennum" - Madhu Balakrishnan
"Thangai Endra" - Tippu, Karthik, Sujatha, Manorama
"Meesai Mutham" - Tippu, Sujatha
"Karutha Machan" - Manikka Vinayagam, Srilekha

References

External links 
 

2006 films
2000s Tamil-language films
Films scored by Vidyasagar